Bubu Mazibuko is a South African actress.  She portrayed Betsy in the 2006 film Catch a Fire.  She also portrayed Thuli in the television series Gaz'lam (2002-2005), for which she was nominated for a Duku Duku Award for Best Female Actor in a Drama.  For her performance as Lindiwe in the film Man on Ground (2011), Mazibuko was nominated for the Africa Magic Viewers' Choice Award for Best Actress in a Drama.

She has been married to Langa Masina since 2016.

Select filmography
Catch a Fire (2006)
Gangster's Paradise: Jerusalema (2008)
A Small Town Called Descent (2010)
Man on Ground (2011)
Mandela: Long Walk to Freedom (2013)

References

External links
 

Living people
Year of birth missing (living people)
21st-century South African actresses
South African film actresses
South African television actresses